Gibberula betancourtae is a species of sea snail, a marine gastropod mollusk, in the family Cystiscidae. It is named after Colombian politician Íngrid Betancourt.

Description
The length of the shell attains 1.9 mm.

Distribution
This species occurs off Guadeloupe.

References

betancourtae
Gastropods described in 2015